Charles Julius Guiteau (September 8, 1841June 30, 1882) was an American man who assassinated James A. Garfield, president of the United States, on July 2, 1881. Guiteau falsely believed he had played a major role in Garfield's election victory, for which he should have been rewarded with a consulship. He was so offended by the Garfield administration's rejections of his applications to serve in Vienna or Paris that he decided to kill Garfield, and shot him at the Baltimore and Potomac Railroad Station in Washington, D.C. Garfield died two months later from infections related to the wounds. In January 1882, Guiteau was sentenced to death for the crime, and was hanged five months later.

Early life and education
Charles J. Guiteau was born in Freeport, Illinois, the fourth of six children of Jane August ( Howe) and Luther Wilson Guiteau, whose family was of French Huguenot ancestry. He moved with his family to Ulao, Wisconsin (near current-day Grafton), in 1850 and lived there until 1855, after his mother died in 1848.  Soon after, Guiteau and his father moved back to Freeport.

Guiteau inherited $1,000 from his grandfather as a young man and went to Ann Arbor, Michigan, to attend the University of Michigan. Due to inadequate academic preparation, he failed the entrance examinations. He crammed in French and algebra at Ann Arbor High School while receiving numerous letters from his father about his progress, but quit before completing the program. In June 1860 he joined the Oneida Community, the utopian religious sect in Oneida, New York, with which Guiteau's father already had close affiliations. According to Brian Resnick of The Atlantic, Guiteau "worshiped" the group's founder, John Humphrey Noyes, once writing that he had "perfect, entire and absolute confidence in him in all things".

Despite the "group marriage" aspects of the Oneida Community, Guiteau was generally rejected during his five years there and his name was turned into a play on words to create the nickname "Charles Gitout". He left the community twice; the first time, he went to Hoboken, New Jersey, and attempted to start a newspaper based on the Oneida religion, called The Daily Theocrat. This failed and he returned to Oneida, only to leave again and file lawsuits against Noyes, in which he demanded payment for the work he had supposedly performed on behalf of the Oneida Community. Guiteau's embarrassed father wrote letters in support of Noyes, who considered Guiteau irresponsible and insane.

Career
Guiteau worked as a clerk at a Chicago law firm and passed a cursory examination to attain admission to the bar. He was not successful as a lawyer, arguing only one case in court, and the bulk of his business was in bill collecting. In 1869 he met and married librarian Annie Bunn. She later detailed his dishonest dealings, describing how he would keep disproportionate amounts from his collections and rarely give the money to his clients.

In 1872, Guiteau and his wife moved to New York City one step ahead of bill collectors and dissatisfied clients. Guiteau took an interest in politics and identified with the Democratic Party. In the 1872 presidential election, he supported Horace Greeley, the Liberal Republican and Democratic candidate, against incumbent Republican Ulysses S. Grant. Guiteau prepared a disorganized speech in support of Greeley, which he delivered once. Greeley was badly defeated, but during the campaign Guiteau became convinced that if Greeley won, he would appoint Guiteau as minister (ambassador) to Chile. Guiteau was physically abusive with his wife; when she wanted a divorce in 1874, he obliged by having sex with a prostitute who then testified to his infidelity.

Turning back to religion, Guiteau published a book on the subject called The Truth, which was almost entirely plagiarized from the work of Noyes. By 1875, Guiteau's father had become convinced that his son was possessed by Satan. Conversely, Guiteau himself became increasingly convinced that his actions were divinely inspired, and that his destiny was to "preach a new Gospel" like Paul the Apostle. He wandered from town to town lecturing to any and all who would listen to his religious ramblings, and in December 1877 gave a lecture at the Congregational Church in Washington, D.C.

Guiteau spent the first half of 1880 in Boston, which he left owing money and under suspicion of theft. On June 11, 1880, he was a passenger on the SS Stonington when it collided with the SS Narragansett at night in heavy fog near the mouth of the Connecticut River. Stonington was able to return to port, but Narragansett burned to the waterline and sank with significant loss of life. Although none of his fellow passengers on Stonington were injured, the incident left Guiteau believing that he had been spared for a higher purpose.

Guiteau's interest then turned again to politics. During the 1880 presidential campaign, the Republican Party was largely split into factions – the Stalwarts, led by Roscoe Conkling, who supported Grant for a third term, and the Half-Breeds, who supported James G. Blaine. Guiteau decided to support the Stalwarts and wrote a speech in support of Grant called "Grant against Hancock", which he revised to "Garfield against Hancock" after Garfield (not affiliated with either faction) won the Republican nomination. Ultimately, Guiteau changed little more in the text than switching Grant's name to Garfield's. The speech was delivered at most twice, and printed copies were passed out to members of the Republican National Committee at their summer 1880 meeting in New York, but Guiteau believed himself to be largely responsible for Garfield's victory over Democrat Winfield Scott Hancock that November. He insisted he should be awarded a consulship for his supposedly vital assistance, first asking for Vienna, then deciding that he would rather have the one in Paris. Guiteau's personal requests to Garfield and his cabinet as one of many job seekers who lined up every day to see them in person were continually rejected, as were his numerous letters.

By the early days of Garfield's administration, which commenced in March 1881, Guiteau was living in Washington, D.C., destitute and forced to sneak between rooming houses without paying for his lodging and meals, and to walk around the cold, snowy city in a threadbare suit, without a coat, hat or boots. He spent his days in hotel lobbies reading discarded newspapers to keep track of the schedules of Garfield and his cabinet and making use of the hotels' complimentary stationery to write letters to them pressing his claim for a consulship. In the spring, Guiteau was still in Washington, and on May 14, 1881, he once more encountered Blaine, now Secretary of State, and inquired about a consular appointment; an exasperated Blaine finally snapped, "Never speak to me again on the Paris consulship as long as you live!"

Assassination of Garfield

Guiteau considered himself a loyal Republican and a Stalwart, and convinced himself that his work for the party had been critical to Garfield's election to the presidency. Later convinced that Garfield was going to destroy the Republican Party by scrapping the patronage system, and distraught after his final encounter with Blaine, he decided the only solution was to remove Garfield and elevate Vice President Chester A. Arthur, an acolyte of Senator Conkling, the Stalwart leader who managed Grant's 1880 campaign and who was not on friendly terms with Garfield.

Guiteau conceded that the president would be too strong to kill with a knife, stating, "Garfield would have crushed the life out of me with a single blow of his fist!" He settled on a gun after contemplating what weapon he would use. Guiteau felt that God told him to kill the president; he felt that such an act would be a "removal" as opposed to an assassination. He also felt that Garfield needed to be killed to rid the Republican Party of Blaine's influence. Borrowing $15 from George Maynard, a relative by marriage, Guiteau set out to purchase a revolver. He knew little about firearms, but believed he would need a large-caliber gun. While shopping at O'Meara's store in Washington, he had to choose between a .442 Webley caliber British Bulldog revolver with wooden grips or one with ivory grips. He preferred the one with the ivory handle because he thought it would look better as a museum exhibit after the assassination. Though he could not afford the extra dollar for the ivory grips, the store owner dropped the price for him. He spent the next few weeks in target practice – the recoil from the revolver almost knocked him over the first time he fired it. Guiteau's weapon was recovered after the assassination and given to the Smithsonian, but it has since been lost.

On one occasion, Guiteau trailed Garfield to the since-demolished Baltimore and Potomac Railroad Station as the president was seeing his wife off to a beach resort in Long Branch, New Jersey, but he decided to postpone his plan because Garfield's wife Lucretia was in poor health and Guiteau did not want to upset her. Having been alerted to the president's schedule by a newspaper article, on July 2, 1881, he lay in wait for Garfield at the railroad station, getting his shoes shined, pacing, and engaging a cab to take him to the station later. As Garfield entered the station, looking forward to a vacation with his wife in Long Branch, Guiteau stepped forward and shot Garfield twice from behind, the second shot piercing the first lumbar vertebra but missing the spinal cord. As he surrendered to authorities, Guiteau said: "I am a Stalwart of the Stalwarts. ... [Chester A.] Arthur is president now!"

Death of Garfield
After a long, painful battle with infections, possibly brought on by his doctors' poking and probing the wound with unwashed hands and non-sterilized instruments, Garfield died on September 19, eleven weeks after being shot. Modern physicians familiar with the case state that Garfield would have easily recovered from his wounds with sterile medical care, which was not common in the United States until a decade later, while Candice Millard argues that Garfield would have survived Guiteau's bullet wound had his doctors simply left him alone. However, Garfield's biographer Allan Peskin stated that medical malpractice did not contribute to Garfield's death; the inevitable infection and blood poisoning that would ensue from a deep bullet wound resulted in damage to multiple organs and spinal bone fragmentation. Rutkow, a professor of surgery at the University of Medicine and Dentistry of New Jersey, has argued that starvation also played a role. Rutkow suggests "Garfield had such a nonlethal wound. In today's world, he would have gone home in a matter of two or three days." The conventional narrative regarding Garfield's post-shooting medical condition was also challenged by Theodore Pappas and Shahrzad Joharifard in a 2013 article in The American Journal of Surgery. They argued that Garfield died from a late rupture of a splenic artery pseudoaneurysm, which developed secondary to the path of the bullet adjacent to the splenic artery. They also argued that his sepsis was actually caused by post-traumatic acute acalculous cholecystitis. Based on the autopsy report, the authors speculate that his gallbladder subsequently ruptured, leading to the development of a large bile-containing abscess adjacent to the gallbladder. Pappas and Joharifard suggest this caused the septic decline in Garfield's condition that was visible starting from July 23, 1881.

Trial and execution

Once Garfield died, the government officially charged Guiteau with murder. He was formally indicted on October 14, 1881, on the charge of murder, which previously had been attempted murder after his arrest. Guiteau pleaded not guilty to the charge. The trial began in Washington, D.C., on November 17, 1881, in the Supreme Court for the District of Columbia (now the U.S. District Court for the District of Columbia). The presiding judge in the case was Walter Smith Cox. Although Guiteau would insist on trying to represent himself during the entire trial, the court appointed Leigh Robinson to defend him. In less than a week of trial, Robinson retired from the case. George Scoville then became lead counsel for the defense. While Scoville's legal experience lay in land title examination, he had married Guiteau's sister and was thus obliged to defend him in court when no one else would. Wayne MacVeagh, the U.S. Attorney General, served as the chief prosecutor. MacVeagh named five lawyers to the prosecution team: George Corkhill, Walter Davidge, retired judge John K. Porter, Elihu Root, and E. B. Smith.

Guiteau's trial was one of the first high-profile cases in the United States where a defense based on a claim of temporary insanity was considered. Guiteau vehemently insisted that while he had been legally insane at the time of the shooting (because God had taken away his free will) he was not really medically insane, which was one of the major causes of the rift between him and his defense lawyers. The judge gave the jury instructions based on the M'Naghten test.

The defense hired Edward Charles Spitzka, who as a psychiatrist was a leading alienist to testify as an expert witness to support an insanity defense. (An alienist is a now-archaic term for a psychiatrist or psychologist who specializes in determining the sanity of a patient for legal purposes, now the field of forensic psychology.) Spitzka had stated that it was clear "Guiteau is not only now insane, but that he was never anything else." While on the stand, Spitzka testified that he had "no doubt" that Guiteau was both insane and "a moral monstrosity". He came to the conclusion that Guiteau had "the insane manner" he had so often observed in asylums, adding that Guiteau was a "morbid egotist" with "a tendency to misinterpret the real affairs of life". He thought the condition to be the result of "a congenital malformation of the brain".

Corkhill, who was the District of Columbia's district attorney and on the prosecuting team, summed up the prosecution's opinion of Guiteau's insanity defense in a pre-trial press statement that also mirrored public opinion on the issue:

Guiteau became something of a media sensation during his entire trial for his bizarre behavior, which included him frequently cursing and insulting the judge, most of the witnesses, the prosecution, and even his defense team, as well as formatting his testimony in epic poems which he recited at length, and soliciting legal advice from random spectators in the audience via passed notes. He dictated an autobiography to the New York Herald, ending it with a personal ad for "a nice Christian lady under 30 years of age". He was oblivious to the American public's hatred of him, even after he was almost assassinated twice himself. He frequently smiled and waved at spectators and reporters in and out of the courtroom.

Guiteau sent a letter in which he argued that Arthur should set him free because he had just increased Arthur's salary by making him president. At one point, Guiteau argued before Cox that Garfield was killed not by the bullets but by medical malpractice; "The doctors killed Garfield, I just shot him." Throughout the trial and up until his execution, Guiteau was housed at St. Elizabeths Hospital in the southeastern quadrant of Washington, D.C. While in prison and awaiting execution, Guiteau wrote a defense of the assassination he had committed and an account of his own trial, which was published as The Truth and the Removal.

To the end, Guiteau was making plans to start a lecture tour after his perceived imminent release and to run for president himself in 1884, while at the same time continuing to delight in the media circus surrounding his trial. He was found guilty on January 25, 1882, and sentenced to death. After the guilty verdict was read, Guiteau stepped forward, despite his lawyers' efforts to tell him to be quiet, and yelled at the jury, saying, "You are all low, consummate jackasses!", plus a further stream of curses and obscenities before he was taken away by guards to his cell to await execution. Guiteau appealed his conviction, but the appeal was rejected.

Twenty-nine days before his execution, Guiteau composed a lengthy poem asserting that God had commanded him to kill Garfield to prevent Blaine's "scheming" to war with Chile and Peru. Guiteau also claimed in the poem that now-President Arthur knew the assassination had saved the United States, and that Arthur's refusal to pardon him was the "basest ingratitude". He also (incorrectly) presumed that Arthur would pressure the Supreme Court into hearing his court appeal.

Guiteau was hanged on June 30, 1882, in the District of Columbia, just two days before the first anniversary of the shooting.

While being led to his execution, Guiteau was said to have continued to smile and wave at spectators and reporters. He notoriously danced his way to the gallows and shook hands with his executioner. On the scaffold, he delivered a "last dying prayer" in which he declared that God "did inspire the act for which I am now murdered" and predicted that "This government and this nation, by this act, will incur They eternal enmity," adding that "Thy divine law of retribution will strike this nation and my murderers." He also excoriated President Arthur as "a coward and an ingrate
"whose ingratitude to the man that made him and saved his party and land from overthrow has no parallel in history." Then, as a last request, he recited a poem "that I wrote this morning about 10 o'clock" called "I am Going to the Lordy", which he had written during his incarceration. He had originally requested an orchestra to play as he sang his poem, but this request was denied.

As per request with the executioner, Guiteau signaled that he was ready to die by dropping the paper. After he finished reading his poem, a black hood was placed over the smiling Guiteau's head and moments later the gallows trapdoor was sprung, the rope breaking his neck instantly with the fall. Guiteau's body was not returned to his family, as they were unable to afford a private funeral, but was instead autopsied and buried in a corner of the jailyard. Upon his autopsy, it was discovered that Guiteau had the condition known as phimosis, an inability to retract the foreskin, which at the time was thought to have caused the insanity that led him to assassinate Garfield.

With tiny pieces of the hanging rope already being sold as souvenirs to a fascinated public, rumors immediately began to swirl that jail guards planned to dig up Guiteau's corpse to meet demands of this burgeoning new market. Fearing scandal, the decision was made to disinter the corpse. The body was sent to the National Museum of Health and Medicine in Maryland, which preserved Guiteau's brain as well as his enlarged spleen discovered at autopsy and bleached the skeleton. These were placed in storage by the museum. Parts of Guiteau's brain remain on display in a jar at the Mütter Museum in Philadelphia.

Psychological assessment

Allan McLane Hamilton said in 1881 that he believed that Guiteau was sane when he assassinated Garfield. An autopsy of Guiteau's brain revealed that his dura mater was abnormally thick, suggesting he may have had neurosyphillis, a disease which causes mental instability; he could have contracted syphilis from a prostitute. George Paulson, formerly the chair of neurology at the Ohio State University, disputed the neurosyphillis diagnosis, arguing that Guiteau had both schizophrenia and "grandiose narcissism".

In 2014, the criminal psychologist Kent Kiehl diagnosed Guiteau as a psychopath, giving him a score of 37.5 out of 40 on the PCL-R scale.

In popular culture

The life of Guiteau, focusing on his psychological disturbances and his plan to kill Garfield, is the subject of "Portrait of an Assassin", a radio play by James Agate Jr. The play was produced as Episode 1125 of CBS Radio Mystery Theater and was first broadcast on October 8, 1980, where he was played by John Lithgow.

Guiteau is depicted in Stephen Sondheim and John Weidman's musical Assassins, wherein he mentors Sara Jane Moore, a woman who attempted to assassinate Gerald Ford. Guiteau sings parts of "I am Going to the Lordy" in the musical's song "The Ballad of Guiteau".

In the American Dad! episode "Garfield and Friends", Hayley Smith uses Guiteau's DNA to revive him and uses him like a bloodhound to track down a revived Garfield.

In the alternate history short story "I Shall Have a Flight to Glory" by Michael P. Kube-McDowell in the 1992 anthology Alternate Presidents edited by Mike Resnick, Guiteau and Garfield are allies against Samuel J. Tilden, who has become a tyrannical president.

Actor Will Janowitz plays Guiteau in the 2016 PBS documentary American Experience: Murder of a President.

The Ramblin' Jack Elliott song "The Death of Mister Garfield" recounts the assassination and the reactions of a fictional witness. Johnny Cash learned the song from Elliott, and later recorded a re-worked version as "Mr. Garfield".

See also 
 List of assassins
 List of people who died by hanging
 Patronage
 Stalwart (politics)
 John Wilkes Booth, assassin of President Abraham Lincoln
 Leon Czolgosz, assassin of President William McKinley
 Lee Harvey Oswald, assassin of President John Kennedy

References
Notes

Further reading

External links 

 
 History House's account of Guiteau's life and the assassination of Garfield, part 1, 2 and 3.
Guiteau, Convicted and in Jail, Declares He is Not a Lunatic, 1882 Original Letter Shapell Manuscript Foundation
 President Garfield's Assassin: Charles Guiteau's Time in Washington  (Ghosts of DC)
 The Truth and the Removal.
 Charles J. Guiteau Collection at Georgetown University Library.
 Autograph album for the Charles J. Guiteau murder trial, MSS SC 3 at L. Tom Perry Special Collections, Harold B. Lee Library, Brigham Young University

1841 births
1882 deaths
19th-century American criminals
19th-century American lawyers
19th-century American poets
American male poets
Illinois lawyers
Epic poets
Executed assassins
19th-century executions by the United States
People from Freeport, Illinois
People from Oneida, New York
People from Grafton, Wisconsin
Executed people from Illinois
American people executed for murder
Assassins of presidents of the United States
American assassins
Assassination of James A. Garfield
19th-century executions of American people
Illinois Republicans
American people of French descent
People involved in plagiarism controversies
1881 murders in the United States
People with antisocial personality disorder
People with narcissistic personality disorder
People with schizophrenia
Stalwarts (Republican Party)
People convicted of murder by District of Columbia
People executed by the District of Columbia by hanging